Norrlands nation is a student society and the largest of thirteen nations at Uppsala University. It mainly recruits its members from the province of Norrland, which is the northernmost part of Sweden. As of 2012, the nation has about 8,000 members.

The nation is religiously and politically unaffiliated and offers its members access to libraries, housing, scholarships and opportunities to participate in a wide range of sporting, cultural and entertainment activities.

Norrlands nation was formed in 1827 through a merger of some smaller nations with roots dating back to the mid 17th century.

The nation owns a building complex of 5,500 square metres by the Fyris River in central Uppsala, with the older part from 1889, the facade being designed by Swedish architect Isak Gustaf Clason.

The students' association for students from Medelpad in Norrlands nation is named after the fictitious skvader from the Medelpad area.

Inspektors 
 Ångermanländska nation

  Västerbottniska nation

  Bottniska nation

  Medelpado-Jämtländska nation

 Norrlands nation

References
Norrlands nation at Swedish Wikipedia

External links
Norrlands nation official web site

Nations at Uppsala University
Norrland
1827 establishments in Sweden
Student organizations established in the 17th century
1646 establishments in Sweden